Events in the year 2021 in Kuwait.

Incumbents
Emir: Nawaf Al-Ahmad Al-Jaber Al-Sabah 
Prime Minister: Sabah Al-Khalid Al-Sabah

Events
Ongoing — COVID-19 pandemic in Kuwait

February 
14 February – Kuwait surpasses 1,000 deaths after reporting 5 new deaths in the past 24 hours.

March 
2 March - The 38th Cabinet formed the government of Kuwait.

July 
23 July - Kuwait competes at the 2020 Summer Olympics with 10 competitors in 5 sports. Lara Dashti became the first Kuwaiti woman to be the flagbearer for Kuwait at any Olympics.
26 July - Abdullah Al-Rashidi won the bronze medal at Shooting in the 2020 Summer Olympics

November 
8 November - The Prime Minister & his government submitted their resignation.
14 November - The Amir accepted the resignation of the Prime Minister & his government.

December 
28 December - The 39th Cabinet formed the government of Kuwait.

Deaths

10 January - Khaled Al-Ansari, (aged 81) writer, researcher & historian, one of the pioneers of Kuwait's literature & history.
24 January - Mohammad Al-Khatib, (aged 77) footballer, former Arabi SC & Kuwait national football team.
11 February - Saad Al Nahedh, (aged 96) former chairman of Kuwait Chamber of Commerce & Industry and founding member of Kuwait Red Crescent Society.
20 February - Basel Al-Rashed, (aged 54) former MP.
25 February – Mashari Al-Ballam, actor (b. 1971).
26 February - Salah Al-Eidan, (aged 51) renowned car racer.
12 March - Khaled Al-Deyain, Interior Ministry Assistant Undersecretary for Services' affairs died due to CoViD-19.
29 March – Abeer Al Khader, actress.
13 April – Jamal Al-Qabendi, footballer, former Kazma Club & Kuwaiti national team (b. 1959).
26 April - Abdulrazaq Al-Adsani, (aged 85) writer & poet.
21 May - Major Abdulaziz Saud Al Dawas, firefighter, died in the line of duty belonging to Salmiya Fire Station.
10 June - Sheikh Mansour Al-Ahmad Al-Jaber Al-Sabeh, (aged 79) member of the royal family.
12 June - Abdulsalam Maqboul, (aged 68) cartoonist.
1 July - Muneera Khaled Al-Mutawwa, philanthropist.
5 July - Ali Hussain Al-Sabti, poet.
22 July - Jawad Ashor, footballer & referee, former Al-Arabi SC & Kuwait national team.
31 July – Intisar Al-Sharrah, actress (b. 1962).
2 August - Mubarak Al-Adwani, Former Information Ministry Undersecretary.
4 August - Latifa Al Barrak, first female Kuwaiti teacher (third Kuwaiti teacher) (b. 1927).
23 August - Sheikha Badriya Al-Ahmad Al-Sabah, member of the royal family.
25 August - Sheikh Ali Fahad Al-Salem Al-Sabah (aged 73) member of the royal family.
5 September - Dr. Shafiq Al-Ghabra, (aged 68) professor & diplomat.
18 September - Abdulmuttaleb Al-Kadhemi, (aged 85) former Oil Minister.
22 September - Mohammad Al-Ruwaished, (aged 65) composer.
8 October - Faisal Al-Hajji Bukhadour, former information minister & state minister for cabinet affairs, former ambassador, advisor at the Primer Minister's Diwan. (b. 1946)
14 October - Saif Marzouq Al-Shamlan, (aged 94) historian & writer, contributed to documenting Kuwait's history.
15 October - Khaled Al-Siddiq, Director. (b. 1945)
10 November - Mohammad Al-Asousi, former National Council for Culture, Arts & Letters (NCCAL) Assistant Secretary General.
17 November - Marzouq Saeed, footballer, former Al-Arabi SC & national Football team.
29 November - Abdulaziz Al-Dousari, founder of Kuwait Credit Bank.
11 December - Sheikh Duaij Khalifah Al-Abdullah Al-Khalifah Al-Sabah, poet. (b. 1971)
20 December - Saad Waleed, footballer, former Jahra SC * Kuwait National team. (b. 1992)

References

 

 
2020s in Kuwait
Years of the 21st century in Kuwait
Kuwait
Kuwait